Neoglyphidodon thoracotaeniatus is a species of damselfish in the family Pomacentridae. It is found in the Indo-Pacific mainly in the Pacific Ocean. It is found in the aquarium trade.

Distribution and habitat
This fish is found in the Indo-Pacific mainly in the Pacific Ocean. Populations in the Indian Ocean only occur around Java in Indonesia. The rest of the populations occur in the Pacific Ocean around Indonesia, Australia, Vietnam, the Philippines, Papua New Guinea, and the Solomon Islands. Usually, they are found in coral reefs.

Description
Its fins have 13 dorsal spines, 12 to 14 dorsal soft rays, 2 anal spines, and 13 to 14 anal soft rays. Like most species of damselfish in the genus Neoglyphidodon, adults and juveniles have different colouration. Adults are black. They have a white area extending from its eye to the pectoral fin in the bottom. They have 3 vertical dark bands in their front. Juveniles have the same pattern but they are yellow. Around their dorsal fin, juveniles have a dark spot. There are turquoise lines around their dark spot and extends to its eyes.

Ecology

Diet
This fish feeds on plankton.

Behaviour
Juveniles stay near the substrate while adults stay more above to feed on drifting plankton.

In the aquarium
This fish is found in the aquarium trade.

Reproduction
Females lay their eggs then males protect them.

References

External links
 

thoracotaeniatus
Fish described in 1928